Keleh may refer to:
 Keleh, Kurdistan
 Keleh Daraq
 Keleh Sepyan